Autarchy may refer to:

 Autarchism, an ideology or practice that promotes individual self-governance
 Autocracy, an ideology or practice that promotes concentration of power in the hands of one person
 Autarky, an ideology of practice that promotes (social, cultural, economic) self-sufficiency

See also
 Autonomy (disambiguation)